North Grimston is a village in the Ryedale district of North Yorkshire, England. It was historically part of the East Riding of Yorkshire until 1974. It is situated between Norton-on-Derwent and Wharram-le-Street on the B1248 road. It is part of the civil parish of Birdsall.

History
The North Grimston sword, dating to the Iron Age was found at North Grimston in 1902.
 
The Church at North Grimston is dedicated to St Nicholas. The font dates back to Saxon times.

North Grimston was served by North Grimston railway station on the Malton and Driffield Railway between 1853 and 1950.

References

External links

Villages in North Yorkshire